Stefan Sjöström (born 30 November 1945) is a Swedish sailor. He competed in the Flying Dutchman event at the 1976 Summer Olympics.

References

External links
 

1945 births
Living people
Swedish male sailors (sport)
Olympic sailors of Sweden
Sailors at the 1976 Summer Olympics – Flying Dutchman
Sportspeople from Gothenburg